In 2004, Democrats made large gains in Concord, winning the governorship, adding 30 seats in the House, two seats in the Senate, winning an Executive Council seat in District 5 for the first time since the 1960s, one of many races won by Democrats for the first time in decades.

Senate

District 1
John T. Gallus (R-Berlin) defeated Jerry Sorlucco (D-Littleton) by a vote of 15,822 (59.5%) to 10,748 (40.4%).

District 2

District 3

District 4

District 5

District 6

District 7

District 8

District 9

District 10

District 11

District 12

District 13

District 14

District 15

District 16

District 17

District 18

District 19

District 20

District 21

District 22

District 23

District 24

House of Representatives

Belknap County

Belknap  1

Belknap 2

Belknap 3

Belknap 4

Belknap 5

Belknap 6

Carroll County

Carroll 1

Carroll 2

Carroll 3

Carroll 4

Carroll 5

Cheshire County

Cheshire 1

Cheshire 2

Cheshire 3

Cheshire 4

Cheshire 5

Cheshire 6

Cheshire 7

Coos County

Coos 1

Coos 2

Coos 3

Coos 4

Grafton County

Grafton 1

Grafton 2

Grafton 3

Grafton 4

Grafton 5

Grafton 6

Grafton 7

Grafton 8

Grafton 9

Grafton 10

Grafton 11

Hillsborough County

Hillsborough 1

Hillsborough 2

Hillsborough 3

Hillsborough 4

Hillsborough 5

Hillsborough 6

Hillsborough 7

Hillsborough 8

Hillsborough 9

Hillsborough 10

Hillsborough 11

Hillsborough 12

Hillsborough 13

Hillsborough 14

Hillsborough 15

Hillsborough 16

Hillsborough 17

Hillsborough 18

Hillsborough 19

Hillsborough 19 consists of the heavily Republican town of Merrimack, which showed during election day as all eight GOP candidates swept the Democratic slate to take the town's eight seats in Concord.

Hillsborough 20

Hillsborough 21

Hillsborough 22

Hillsborough 23

Hillsborough 24

 The 24th District of Hillsborough County, consisting of Nashua's mostly urban and Democratic Ward 6, was swept by the Democrats, including a dual primary sweep by David Campbell.

The only Republican running in Hillsborough 24 was City GOP Chairwoman Sandra Ziehm.

Hillsborough 25

Hillsborough 26

Hillsborough 27

Merrimack County

Merrimack 1

Merrimack 2

Merrimack 3

Merrimack 4

Merrimack 5

Merrimack 6

Merrimack 7

Merrimack 8

Merrimack 9

Merrimack 10

Merrimack 11

Merrimack 12

Merrimack 13

Rockingham County

Rockingham 1

Rockingham 2

Rockingham 3

Rockingham 4

Rockingham 5

Rockingham 6

Rockingham 7

Rockingham 8

Rockingham 9

Rockingham 10

Rockingham 11

Rockingham 12

Rockingham 13

Rockingham 14

Rockingham 15

Rockingham 16

Rockingham 17

Rockingham 18

Strafford County

Strafford 1

Strafford 2

Strafford 3

Strafford 4

Strafford 5

Strafford 6

Strafford 7

Sullivan County

Sullivan 1

Sullivan 2

Sullivan 3

In the non-floterial first past the post district of Sullivan 3, which consists of the town of Sunapee, Republican Harry S. Gale defeated Democrat "Hometown" David Brown in the race to refill the seat of non-returning Republican incumbent Richard Leone.

Sullivan 4

Sullivan 5

2004/2005 special elections and current open seats
Due to the large number of seats in the House and the relative old age of the Representatives (the current average age is 66), many members often leave the House either from death or resignation.

Strafford 3
After Michael Harrington was appointed as a member of the Public Utility Commission in November 2004, he vacated his seat in Strafford County District 3, which includes Barrington, Farmington, Middleton, Milton, New Durham and Strafford. 

On March 8, 2005, Democrat Larry Brown of Milton defeated Republican Wilfred Morrison of Farmington 1,858 to 1,551, picking up a seat for the Democrats.
Election page from the New Hampshire Secretary of State

Sullivan 4
The same day as the special election in Strafford District 3, a special election in Sullivan District 4, which consists of Unity, Lempster and Claremont, was held to replace the departure of Democrat Joe Harris. 

Republican challenger Phillip "Joe" Osgood defeated former Claremont mayor Ray Gagnon by a tally of 1,125 to 895. 
Election page from the New Hampshire Secretary of State

Hillsborough 1
In a surprising upset, Democrat Gilman Shattuck defeated former Hillsborough County Sheriff and Republican Walter Morse 669 to 601 on June 14, 2005. 

The two were competing for Republican Larry Elliot's seat in the largely Republican district of Hillsborough 1, consisting of the county's northwesternmost towns: Antrim, Hancock, Hillsborough and Windsor. After Shattuck's victory, Democrats held two of the district's three seats, a feat not copied since before the Civil War. 
Monadnock Ledger story
Election page from the New Hampshire Secretary of State

Cheshire 3
In Cheshire District 3, consisting of the five wards of Keene, Stephanie Sinclair left her seat in mid-spring 2005 because she moved out of New Hampshire. The opening was filled on October 14, 2005 by Keene City Councilman Chris Coates, who received 250 votes while running unopposed. The Democrats kept the seat in the highly Democratic district, continuing their one-seat pickup from special elections after the 2004 general election.
Election page from the New Hampshire Secretary of State

Hillsborough 10
On City Election Day, 2005 (November 8), Democrat Jean Jeudy defeated Republican Rob Fremeau, protecting the party's seat after the departure of Firefighter's Union President William Clayton in a special election in Hillsborough District 10, the State Representative district of Manchester's Ward 3. 

Jeudy defeated Fremeau 508 to 322, keeping the Democrats in complete control of the ward's three seats. The election was largely overshadowed by the simultaneous mayoral race, where Frank Guinta upset incumbent Bob Baines.
Election page from the New Hampshire Secretary of State

Grafton 6
The Democrats gained another seat as Jim Aguiar of Campton defeated Christopher Whitcomb of Rumney in the Grafton District 6 (Campton, Ellsworth, Orford, Rumney and Wentworth) special election on December 6, 2005. Aguiar won 558-526, replacing Republican John Alger, who died several weeks earlier.
Election page from the New Hampshire Secretary of State

Rockingham 3
On January 24, 2006, Democrat John Robinson upset Republican Al Baldasaro 57% to 43% in the heavily Republican district of Rockingham 3, which consists of the towns of Londonderry and Auburn.
Election page from the New Hampshire Secretary of State
John Robinson's website
Article on the primary at the Lawrence Eagle Times (subscription required)

References

2004 New Hampshire elections
New Hampshire General Court elections
New Hampshire